Slow Motion Apocalypse is the second studio album by Grotus, released on April 20, 1993, by Alternative Tentacles. Boasting eastern music influences and a more mature sound, the album is considered by some to be the highlight of their career, despite Allmusic considering Brown their best album pick. The album also leans towards a more metal sound, unlike the first and last releases.

Release and reception
Trouser Press noted that the album contains "the alluring music of Luddite and a judicious bit of the sampling activity of Brown" and "Middle Eastern flavor that conjures images of an armor-plated belly dancer."

Accolades

Track listing

Personnel
Adapted from the Slow Motion Apocalypse liner notes.

Grotus
 Bruce Boyd – drums, cover art, design
 John Carson – bass guitar, sampler
 Lars Fox – vocals, sampler, percussion
 Adam Tanner – Fender Bass VI, guitar, Jupiter-8, sampler, cover art, design

Production and additional personnel
 Fawnee Evnochides – cover art, design
 Grotus – production
 Eric Holland – production, engineering

Release history

References

External links 
 

1993 albums
Grotus albums
Alternative Tentacles albums